The New Brunswick Legislative Building is the home to the Legislative Assembly of New Brunswick, and is located in Fredericton, New Brunswick, Canada. Opened in 1882, the Second Empire style structure was designed by Saint John architect J.C. Dumaresq and replaced the previous home destroyed by fire in 1877.

The height of the building (measured to the top of the rotunda) is approximately 41 meters high.

The building is home to:

 Legislative Assembly Chamber
 Legislative Assembly Office
 Legislative Council Chamber – now used for committee meetings
 Office of the Speaker
 Office of the Clerk
 Legislative Library

References

External links

New Brunswick Legislative website

Buildings and structures in Fredericton
Legislative buildings in Canada
Politics of New Brunswick
Second Empire architecture in Canada
New Brunswick Legislature
Burned buildings and structures in Canada
Rebuilt buildings and structures in Canada